The 1983 municipal election was held October 17, 1983 to elect a mayor and twelve aldermen to sit on Edmonton City Council in Alberta, Canada, nine trustees to sit on the public school board, and seven trustees to sit on the separate school board.

Electoral system
Mayor was elected through First past the post.

Councillors were elected through Plurality block voting, two per ward, where each voter could cast up to two votes.

School board positions also were filled through Plurality block voting as well.

Voter turnout

There were 160942 ballots cast out of 382053 eligible voters, for a voter turnout of 42.1%.

Results

(bold indicates elected, italics indicate incumbent)

Mayor

Aldermen
Guide:
E.V.A = Edmonton Voters Association
R.C.C. = Responsible Citizens Committee
U.R.G.E. = Urban Reform Group Edmonton

Public school trustees

Joan Cowling - 51434
Don Massey - 50007
Mel Binder - 46872
Elaine Jones - 44147
Dick Mather - 40921
George Luck - 27746
Marion Herbert - 27460
Michael Belaire - 24864
John Lakusta - 23313
George Hum - 22814
David Gowan-Smith - 22405
Edward Hall - 22198
Jeff Martin - 19260
Olga Cylurik - 19001
Douglas Elves - 18240
Michael McDaid - 16380
James Bondarenko - 15907

Separate (Catholic) school trustees

Catherine Chichak - 18290
Jean McDonald - 17690
Francis O'Hara - 15864
William Green - 14690
Phil Gibeau - 14171
Hugh Tadman - 13759
Alice Gagne - 12767
Elizabeth Reid - 11403
Diana McIntyre - 10556
Mark Toth - 9890
Sarah Clancy - 8528
James Shinkaruk - 8454
Simone Secker - 7879
John Higgins - 7745

References

External links

City of Edmonton: Edmonton Elections

1983
1983 elections in Canada
1983 in Alberta